Paludal is derived from the Latin word palus ("marsh").

Paludal, in geology, refers to sediments that accumulated in a marsh environment.
Paludal, in ecology, refers to the environment of a marsh.

Sedimentology